Alexander Tarrant-Keepa (born 1990/1991), known professionally  as Alex Tarrant, is a New Zealand actor. With multiple TV and film credits, he currently portrays Kai Holman in the CBS action crime drama NCIS: Hawaiʻi and Valandil on Amazon Prime's The Lord of the Rings: The Rings of Power fantasy drama.

Early life and education
Tarrant grew up in Raglan, New Zealand. He has Māori, Samoan, and Niuean ancestors. He graduated from Fraser High School in 2008. While at high school, he participated in the New Zealand Shakespeare Globe Centre's national schools production and was then part of the Young Shakespeare Company in 2009.

Tarrant graduated from Toi Whakaari, New Zealand's foremost national drama school, in 2012, having won the Museum Art Hotel Scholarship for his final year. While at Toi Whakaari, Tarrant was diagnosed with dyslexia.

Career
Tarrant appeared in season four of SeaChange, and played Maui in the 2015 BBC series Tatau.

Tarrant appeared in  When We Go to War, Filthy Rich, 800 Words, and The Other Side of Heaven 2: Fire of Faith. From 2018 to 2019, he played the despised Dr. Lincoln Kimiora on the New Zealand prime-time soap opera Shortland Street.

He played a rebel leader in the 2021 film, Night Raiders, which was selected for the 2021 Toronto International Film Festival. He is currently filming the Amazon Prime Video's series The Lord of the Rings: The Rings of Power. Tarrant currently stars in the new CBS series, NCIS: Hawaiʻi, which premiered in September 2021.

Personal life 
Tarrant is married to actress Luci Hare and they have a son.

Filmography

Notes

References

External links

Living people
New Zealand male film actors
New Zealand male television actors
Toi Whakaari alumni
1990 births